The neighbouring countries of Bangladesh and Myanmar had a generally frosty relationship under the Burmese military junta as a result of the presence of over 270,000 Rohingya refugees in Bangladesh often served as a major irritant. The civil society and political class of Bangladesh often voiced solidarity for Burma's pro-democracy struggle. However, relations between the two nations have nose-dived exponentially as a result of Rohingya genocide which has resulted in the influx of over 1.1 million Rohingya refugees from Rakhine State in Myanmar, to Bangladesh.

History 
Operation Clean and Beautiful Nation was a military operation conducted by the Tatmadaw (Myanmar Armed Forces) in northern Rakhine State, near Myanmar's border with Bangladesh in 1991. In December 1991, Tatmadaw soldiers crossed the border and accidentally fired on a Bangladeshi military outpost, resulting in Bangladesh Army aiding Rohingya Solidarity Organisation as retaliation. The conflict ended in Burmese tactical failure.

On 7 October 1998, between three and five Bangladeshi fishermen were killed by Burmese Navy forces just off the coast of St. Martin's Island. On 8 September 1999, one Bangladeshi fisherman was shot and killed by Burmese Navy forces near St. Martin's Island. Nine crewmen from the victim's fishing boat abandoned it, swam for their lives, and were rescued by Bangladeshi forces. The Bangladeshi government lodged a formal protest note to Myanmar. On 20 August 2000, the Bangladeshi police reported that Burmese border guards had shot and killed four Bangladeshi fishermen off the coast of St. Martin's Island.

The November 2008 Bangladesh–Myanmar naval standoff caused the relations between two countries deteriorate, as Myanmar allowed the South Korean company Daewoo to explore the seabed in an area southwest of St. Martin's Island, the area that was contested between Bangladesh and Myanmar as part of their respective exclusive economic zones. Myanmar deployed two naval warships to protect its assets. Citing international law, Bangladesh asserted that Myanmar should not allow any kind of activities in disputed territories until a resolution. As a result, Myanmar withdrew its warships and Daewoo began to remove its equipment from the area. In 2012, the International Tribunal for the Law of the Sea granted the disputed area to Bangladesh, resulting in both tactical and strategic victory for Bangladesh.

In December 2016, the Bangladeshi border guard accused the Myanmar Navy of firing on four Bangladeshi fishermen in the Bay of Bengal, leading to a formal protest.

On 6 October 2018, the government of Myanmar updated its 2015-2018 map of Myanmar Information Management Unit showing St. Martin as a part of their sovereign territory and spread the maps in two global websites. Following the event, the Myanmar Ambassador in Dhaka was summoned by the Government of Bangladesh on 6 October 2018. Rear Admiral (retd) Md Khurshed Alam, maritime affairs secretary at the Bangladesh Ministry of Foreign Affairs handed over a strongly worded protest note to him. The Myanmar envoy said it was a "mistake" to show the St. Martin's Island as part of his country's territory.

In the first week of September 2020, Bangladeshi forces reported that the Tatmadaw started amassing troops and doing unusual buildups in three different locations on the Bangladesh-Myanmar border. As a consequence, Bangladesh's foreign minister summoned Myanmar's ambassador, calling for him to desist from such activities and to work for mutually beneficial relations between the two countries. At the time, Bangladesh was concerned about these suspicious actions due to this same kind of buildup resulting in the displacement of nearly a million Rohingya from their homelands to Bangladesh in 2017. As a result, Bangladesh revealed that is ready to face any situation, deploying the 34 Border Guard Bangladesh battalion on the border with Myanmar. This battalion asked their counterparts to arrange a flag meeting but they received no response.

Aung Kyaw Moe, the ambassador of Myanmar to Bangladesh, was summoned by the Bangladesh ministry of foreign affairs four times in 2022 due to Myanmar Army's violation of Bangladesh’s airspace in the Naikhongchhari bordering area multiple times.

See also
 Bangladesh–Myanmar border
 Rohingya genocide
 Rohingya refugees in Bangladesh
 Naf War

References 

 
Myanmar
Bilateral relations of Myanmar